Xanlıqlar may refer to:
 Xanlıqlar, Nakhchivan, Azerbaijan
 Xanlıqlar, Qazakh, Azerbaijan